The 2020–21 Women's EHF European League was the 40th edition of EHF's second-tier women's handball competition, running from 10 October 2020 to 9 May 2021. The tournament was previously called Women's EHF Cup.

There was no defending champion, after last season was cancelled due to the COVID-19 pandemic.

Overview

Team allocation

Round and draw dates
The schedule of the competition was as follows (all draws were held at the EHF headquarters in Vienna, Austria). The EHF announced that the originally planned first qualification round in September would be skipped.

Qualification stage

Round 2
There were 12 teams participating in round 2. 
The first legs were played on 10–11 October and the second legs were played on 16–17 October 2020.

|}
Notes

1 Both legs were hosted by HC Dunărea Brăila.
2 Both legs were hosted by Paris 92.

Round 3
A total of 24 teams entered the draw for the third qualification round, which was held on Tuesday, 20 October 2020.

The first legs were played on 14–15 November and the second legs were played on 21–22 November 2020.

|}
Notes

1 Teams agreed to decide the winner of their tie based one match. 
2 Both legs were hosted by HC Dunărea Brăila.

Group stage 

The draw for the group phase was held on Thursday, 26 November 2020. In each group, teams played against each other in a double round-robin format, with home and away matches.

Group A

Group B

Group C

Group D

Quarterfinals

|}

Matches

Final four 
The final four was held at the Sala Sporturilor Lascăr Pană in Baia Mare, Romania on 8 and 9 May 2021. The draw was made on 15 April 2021.

Bracket

Semifinals

Third place game

Final

Top goalscorers

See also 
 2020–21 Women's EHF Champions League
 2020–21 Women's EHF European Cup
 2020–21 EHF European League

Notes

References

External links
 Official website

 
Women's EHF Cup seasons
EHF European League Women
EHF European League Women
Sport in Baia Mare